Ninian Edward Whiteside (December 25, 1812September 1, 1876) was an American Democratic politician, attorney, and pioneer who served as the 1st Speaker of the Wisconsin State Assembly and 9th Speaker of the California State Assembly. Whiteside is believed to be the only person to serve as the Speaker of the House in two separate state legislatures in the United States.

Early life and career 
Born in the Illinois Territory, Whiteside settled in the mining district in southern Wisconsin. Whiteside practiced law as a member of the Wisconsin Bar.

Legislative career 
In 1846, Whiteside served in the first Wisconsin Constitutional Convention of 1846. In 1847–1848, Whiteside served in the Wisconsin Territorial Council. In 1848, Whiteside was elected to the first Wisconsin State Assembly from Belmont, Wisconsin and was elected the first Speaker of the Wisconsin Assembly. He then went to California to take part in the California Gold Rush. In the same year, he was elected to the California State Assembly and was elected Speaker of the California State Assembly by a vote of 66–6. Whiteside was a delegate to the Breckinridge Convention in 1860. Whiteside served in the State Assembly until an election defeat in 1863.

Achievements 
While in the Wisconsin Legislature, Whiteside authored new laws regarding the renaming and restructuring of new villages and towns; renovations and repairs to the Wisconsin State Capitol; a new municipal water and well system for the capitol building; local tax levy requirements; establishment of the office of adjutant general of the militia of the State of Wisconsin; and plaintiff liabilities.

While in the California State Legislature, Whiteside authored new laws regarding incorporation of the Hornitos, California; restricting of herding of sheep to certain California county pastures; a new special tax levy for county jails; expansion of powers for the Board of Supervisors of the City and County of San Francisco and a funding bill for the City of Oakland, California.

Death 
Whiteside continued to practice law as a member of the State Bar of California until his retirement. He died in Marysville, California after an illness.

Notes

External links

People from Illinois
People from Marysville, California
People from Belmont, Wisconsin
People of the California Gold Rush
Speakers of the California State Assembly
Democratic Party members of the California State Assembly
Speakers of the Wisconsin State Assembly
Democratic Party members of the Wisconsin State Assembly
Members of the Wisconsin Territorial Legislature
1812 births
1876 deaths
19th-century American politicians
Wisconsin pioneers